Barry Julian Eichengreen (born 1952) is an American economist and economic historian who holds the title of George C. Pardee and Helen N. Pardee Professor of Economics and Political Science at the University of California, Berkeley, where he has taught since 1987. Eichengreen currently serves as a research associate at the National Bureau of Economic Research and as a Research Fellow at the Centre for Economic Policy Research.

Eichengreen's mother was Lucille Eichengreen, a Holocaust survivor and author.

Career
Eichengreen has done research and published widely on the history and current operation of the international monetary and financial system.  He received his A.B. from UC Santa Cruz in 1974. an M.A. in economics, an M.Phil. in economics, an M.A. in history, and a Ph.D. in economics from Yale University in New Haven, Connecticut.

He was a senior policy advisor to the International Monetary Fund in 1997 and 1998, although he has since been critical of the IMF. In 1997, he served as a fellow of the American Academy of Arts and Sciences.

Research
His best known work is the book Golden Fetters: The Gold Standard and the Great Depression, 1919–1939, Oxford University Press, 1992.  In his own book on the Great Depression, Ben Bernanke summarized Eichengreen's thesis as follows:

The main evidence Eichengreen adduces in support of this view is the fact that countries that abandoned the gold standard earlier saw their economies recover more quickly.

His recent books include Global Imbalances and the Lessons of Bretton Woods (MIT Press 2006), The European Economy Since 1945 (Princeton University Press 2007), Exorbitant Privilege: The Rise and Fall of the Dollar and the Future of the International Monetary System (Oxford University Press 2011), The Populist Temptation: Economic Grievance and Political Reaction in the Modern Era (Oxford University Press 2018), and In Defense of Public Debt (Oxford University Press 2021).

His most cited paper is Bayoumi and Eichengreen "Shocking Aspects of European Monetary Unification" (1993) which argued that the European Union was less suitable as a Single Currency Area than the United States. This diagnosis was confirmed in 2011 when external shocks caused the Eurozone Crisis.

He has been President of the Economic History Association (2010–2011). In addition to this, he is a non-resident Senior Fellow at the Centre for International Governance Innovation and a regular contributor to Project Syndicate since 2003. He was convener of the Bellagio Group from 2008-2020.

Publications 

 Elusive Stability: Essays in the History of International Finance 1919–1939. Cambridge University Press, 1990 
 Golden Fetters: The Gold Standard and the Great Depression, 1919–1939. Oxford University Press, 1992, 
 International Monetary Arrangements for the 21st Century. Brookings Institution Press, 1994, 
 Reconstructing Europe's Trade and Payments: The European Payments Union. University of Michigan Press, 1994, 
 Globalizing Capital: A History of the International Monetary System. Princeton University Press, 1996, ; 2. Auflage ebd. 2008, 
 Vom Goldstandard zum EURO. Die Geschichte des internationalen Währungssystems. Wagenbach, Berlin 2000, 
 European Monetary Unification: Theory, Practice, Analysis. The MIT Press, 1997 
 with José De Gregorio, Takatoshi Ito & Charles Wyplosz: An Independent and Accountable IMF. Centre for Economic Policy Research, 1999, 
 Toward A New International Financial Architecture: A Practical Post-Asia Agenda. Institute for International Economics, 1999, 
 Financial Crises and What to Do About Them. Oxford University Press, 2002, 
 with Erik Berglöf, Gérard Roland, Guido Tabellini & Charles Wyplosz:  Built to Last: A Political Architecture for Europe. CEPR, 2003, 
 Capital Flows and Crises. The MIT Press, 2004, 
 Global Imbalances and the Lessons of Bretton Woods. The MIT Press, 2006, 
 The European Economy Since 1945: Co-ordinated Capitalism and Beyond. Princeton University Press, 2008, 
 Exorbitant Privilege: The Rise and Fall of the Dollar and the Future of the International Monetary System, Oxford University Press, New York 2010 
 with Dwight H. Perkins and Kwanho Shin: From Miracle to Maturity: The Growth of the Korean Economy, Harvard University Asia Center. 2012, 
 Hall of Mirrors: The Great Depression, The Great Recession, and the Uses-and Misuses-of History, Oxford University Press, New York 2015 
 How Global Currencies Work: Past, Present, and Future 2017
 The Populist Temptation: Economic Grievance and Political Reaction in the Modern Era, Oxford University Press, New York 2018
 In Defense of Public Debt, Oxford University Press, New York 2021

References

External links

 Barry Eichengreen at the University of California at Berkeley
 Column archive at Project Syndicate
 Column archive at The Guardian
 Barry Eichengreen at The Economist
 Barry Eichengreen at East Asia Forum
 
 
 Barry Eichengreen in the Editorial Board of Financial History Review
 The Use and Abuse of Monetary History, April 2013 – A guest commentary about the US Federal Reserve System and the European Central Bank's monetary policies. at CFO Insight
 
 

1952 births
Living people
21st-century American economists
Economic historians
Yale Graduate School of Arts and Sciences alumni
University of California, Berkeley College of Letters and Science faculty
American people of German-Jewish descent
Fellows of the American Academy of Arts and Sciences
Institute for New Economic Thinking
Peterson Institute for International Economics
Presidents of the Economic History Association